Carolyn Edmonds is an American politician who served as a member of the King County Council from 2002 to 2006. A member of the Democratic Party, she represented the 1st district.

References 

Living people
King County Councillors
Democratic Party members of the Washington House of Representatives
Year of birth missing (living people)
Women state legislators in Washington (state)